Thermote & Vanhalst (also known as TVH) is a Belgian company which provides spare parts and accessories for industrial and agricultural equipment.

History
Thermote & Vanhalst was founded in 1969 by Paul Thermote and Paul Vanhalst. It initially focused on lift trucks and agricultural machinery in Belgium, later expanding to the rest of Europe, Japan, and Australia. Besides providing spare parts for industrial and agricultural equipment, it has partnerships with mining companies, as well as companies focused on ergonomic seating and diagnostic software.

In 2021 TVH Group was split into TVH Parts and Mateco Holding when the co-founding families decided to part ways. Paul Vanhalst's son, Pascal Vanhalst, sold his 40% holding in TVH Parts to D'Ieteren; Ann and Els, the daughters of Paul Thermote, retained their 60% holding.

References

External links
 Official TVH website
 Official TVH Parts Co website

Truck manufacturers of Belgium
Waregem
Vehicle manufacturing companies established in 1969
1969 establishments in Belgium
Companies based in West Flanders